Amandine Fouquenet (born 19 February 2001) is a French professional racing cyclist, who currently rides for UCI Women's Continental Team . In October 2020, she rode in the women's edition of the 2020 Liège–Bastogne–Liège race in Belgium.

References

External links
 

2001 births
Living people
French female cyclists
Cyclo-cross cyclists
People from Vitré, Ille-et-Vilaine
Sportspeople from Ille-et-Vilaine
Cyclists from Brittany
21st-century French women